The 2013–14 Football League Two was Wycombe Wanderers' 126th season in existence and their twentieth season in the Football League. This page shows the statistics of the club's players in the season, and also lists all matches that the club played during the season.

The season also marked the end of Ivor Beeks' 28-year career as Wycombe's chairman, on 21 August 2013. During the 28 years he spent as chairman, he oversaw the club's rise from the Isthmian League into the Football League. He continues his affiliation with the club in the role of vice-president.

Wycombe ended the season in dramatic style, by achieving League Two survival on the final day of the season. On 3 May 2014, Wycombe began the day three points adrift of safety in the relegation zone. However, after a 3–0 victory away at Torquay, coupled with Bristol Rovers' 1–0 defeat to Mansfield, Wycombe stayed up on goal difference, whilst Bristol dropped out of the Football League.

League data

League table

Match results

Legend

Friendlies

League Two

FA Cup

League Cup

League Trophy

Squad statistics

Appearances and goals

|-
|colspan="14"|Players left the club before the end of the season:

|}

Goalscorers

*Hause and Knott left the club before the end of the season

Disciplinary record

Transfers 

 Charles Dunne agreed a transfer to Blackpool on 24 August 2013, although he immediately returned to Wycombe on a season-long loan.

See also
 2013–14 in English football
 2013–14 Football League Two
 Wycombe Wanderers F.C.
 Gareth Ainsworth
 Adams Park

References

External links
 Wycombe Wanderers official website

Wycombe Wanderers F.C. seasons
Wycombe Wanderers